The article lists the census towns in Kerala state of India. There exists a total number of 461 census towns in the state. A census town is notified only if it has a minimum population of 5000, at least 75% of the male working population engaged in non-agricultural pursuits and a population density of 400 per sq.km.

List of census towns

See also
 List of most populous urban agglomerations in Kerala
 Demographics of Kerala

References 

 
Census towns